Francis J. McCrehan was an American baseball player and coach at Boston College.

Early life
McCrehan was born in Cambridge, Massachusetts. His father, Jack McCrehan, was a Cambridge police officer. One of his brothers, Jeremiah “Jud” McCrehan was a minor league baseball player.

Playing career

Cambridge High and Latin School
McCrehan, nicknamed Cheese, played high school baseball at Cambridge High and Latin School. He was the starting pitcher for the 1921 CHLS team that won 27 straight games and won the Suburban League championship. His teammates included Doc Gautreau and Sonny Foley.

Boston College
McCrehan pitched for the Boston College Eagles baseball team from 1922 to 1925. On June 18, 1923, McCrehan led BC to a 4–1 victory over Ownie Carroll and the Holy Cross Crusaders in front of 30,000 fans at Braves Field. It was one of only two games Carroll lost in his collegiate career (the other was to Charlie Caldwell and Princeton the same year).

Minor league and semi-pro baseball
In 1925, McCrehan signed with the Jersey City Skeeters of the International League. In 1926 he pitched for the Haverhill Hillies of the New England League. In 23 games he had a 7–4 record and an ERA of 4.25. He had a tryout with the Cincinnati Reds but was not offered a contract.

McCrehan was also the player-coach of the North Cambridge Knights of Columbus baseball team and spent five seasons as a member of North Cambridge's team in the Twilight League, where he played with former high school teammates Gautreau and Foley as well as Bill Cleary. The Twilight League club was considered to be one of the best in the state and drew over 30,000 to Russell Field on multiple occasions.

Coaching
In 1926, McCrehan joined Jack Slattery's coaching staff at Boston College as pitching coach. In 1928 he was made the freshman coach. In 1931 he was promoted to head coach of the varsity team. He resigned before the 1939 season due to pressures from his work for the Commonwealth of Massachusetts.

Government service
In 1937, McCrehan was appointed by Governor Charles F. Hurley to manage the Boston central office of the State Unemployment Commission. He later worked as a supervisor for the State Department of Education and with Massachusetts' Civil Defense agency. During World War II he was a physical education instructor in the United States Navy. In 1949 he was elected to the Cambridge school committee. He remained on the board until his defeat in 1955.

Personal life and death
McCrehan resided at 146 Rindge Avenue before moving in with his cousin, Mary Louise Riley. He died on March 10, 1960, at the age of 57.

References

Date of birth missing
1960 deaths
Boston College alumni
Boston College Eagles baseball coaches
Boston College Eagles baseball players
Haverhill Hillies players
Jersey City Skeeters players
Sportspeople from Cambridge, Massachusetts
United States Navy personnel of World War II